The 2021 CS Asian Open Figure Skating Trophy was held on October 13–17, 2021 in Beijing, China. It was scheduled as part of the 2021–22 ISU Challenger Series, although it was later re-classified as an international event. It also served as the test event for the 2022 Winter Olympics. Medals were awarded in the disciplines of men's singles, women's singles, pair skating, and ice dance.

In January 2021, the International Skating Union announced that the 2021 Asian Open Trophy would replace the 2020–21 Grand Prix Final as the designated international test event for the 2022 Winter Olympics. The 2020–21 Grand Prix Final was cancelled because of the COVID-19 pandemic. The Beijing 2022 organizing committee also conducted a domestic, internal test event program for the Olympics in April 2021.

After a series of withdrawing by international participants, the 2021 Asian Open Trophy was unable to meet the minimum entry requirements to be classified as a Challenger event. The singles disciplines, which had competitors from multiple countries, were re-classified as regular international (Senior B) events; the pairs and ice dance events only featured domestic competitors and were therefore not considered as international competitions.

Entries 
The International Skating Union published the list of entries on September 21, 2021.

Changes to preliminary assignments

Results

Men

Women

Pairs

Ice dance

References

External links 
 Asian Open Trophy at the International Skating Union
 Results

Asian Figure Skating Trophy
Asian Open Trophy
Asian Open Trophy
Asian Open Trophy